Ella Moore was a Canadian barque that enjoyed a long career sailing the North Atlantic and survived many storms and even a grounding in 1892 before being scrapped in 1907.

Construction 
Ella Moore was built in Halls Harbour, Nova Scotia, Canada, for the D.B. & C.F. Eaton of Cornwallis company. She was completed 1867 and was at the time one of the largest vessels built in Halls Harbour.

Career 
Ella Moore enjoyed a long career on the North Atlantic, where she survived a number of severe storms that lightly damaged her. She also made some fast passages, including a voyage in 1881 from Eatonville, Nova Scotia, to Belfast, Ireland, and back with  a cargo of lumber which she made in only two months.

Ella Moore ran aground on rocks near Canso, Nova Scotia with a cargo of railroad ties. Despite her precarious position, she was refloated, repaired, and returned to service later that year.

Final disposition 
Ella Moore was scrapped in 1907. She had sailed the North Atlantic for 40 years before her retirement.

References

1867 ships
Barques
Ships of Canada
Ships built in Canada
Maritime incidents in 1892